Clyde Prestowitz (born 1941) is the founder and President of the Economic Strategy Institute. He formerly served as counselor to the Secretary of Commerce in the Reagan Administration.  He is a labor economist.  Prestowitz has written for Foreign Affairs.

Early life and education
Prestowitz was born to a family with a conservative Republican and evangelical Christian background  and earned a B.A. with honors from Swarthmore College; an M.A. in East-West Policies and Economics from the East-West Center of the University of Hawaii; and an M.B.A. from the Wharton School of the University of Pennsylvania.

Books and articles
 Our Incoherent China Policy: The proposed Trans-Pacific Partnership is bad economics, and even worse as containment of China. American Prospect  Fall 2015
 Could Germany save eurozone by leaving it? CNN  May 30, 2012
 The Betrayal of American Prosperity: Free Market Delusions, America's Decline, and How We Must Compete in the Post-Dollar Era, 2010  
 Three Billion New Capitalists:  The Great Shift of Wealth And Power to the East, 2005
 The South Korean Firehose The Globalist  July 25, 2005
 Don't Pester Europe on Genetically Modified Food The New York Times Op-Ed January 24, 2003
 Rogue Nation - American Unilateralism and The Failure of Good Intentions, 2003
 Trading Places - How We Are Giving Our Future to Japan and How to Reclaim It, 1993

Multimedia
 The World Turned Upside Down: The Impact of the Return of India and China to their Historical Global Weight MIT World Video - 04-04-06
  In Depth: Tuff Enough? Can the US continue to command the attention of world markets when the dollar is dropping and free trade is flourishing? PBS' Foreign Exchange with Fareed Zakaria,  aired on August 4, 2006.  Transcript 
 Three Billion New Capitalists book interview on ABC Radio Australia, July 11, 2006

References

Sources

External links
 Economic Strategy Institute
 

American Presbyterians
Reagan administration personnel
United States Department of Commerce officials
Living people
Swarthmore College alumni
Wharton School of the University of Pennsylvania alumni
1941 births
Carnegie Council for Ethics in International Affairs